Nigel Aspinall (born 1946) is a croquet player from England.

Aspinall was one of the most successful croquet players in the 1970s and 1980s, winning the President's Cup eleven times (1969, 1970, 1973, 1974, 1975, 1976, 1978, 1980, 1982, 1984 and 1985), the Open Championship eight times (1969, 1974, 1975, 1976, 1978, 1982, 1983 and 1984) and the Men's Championship twice (1973 and 1983).
Aspinall represented Great Britain in four MacRobertson Shield tournaments, winning on two occasions.

In 2007, Aspinall was inducted into the World Croquet Federation Hall of Fame.

Career statistics

References

External links
The Croquet Records website

1946 births
English croquet players
Living people
Place of birth missing (living people)